Njupeskär is a waterfall in the river Njupån in Fulufjället National Park, Sweden. With a total height of about 93 meters, it is not the highest waterfall in Sweden. Newer sources provide that the total height of waterfall is 125 m and the tallest plunge is 95 m high. 
Njupeskär falls over the rim of eroded sandstone plateau of Fulufjället, waterfall has formed an impressive canyon. A few days per year, in early morning around midsummer, the sun shines on the waterfall .

Controversy
Njupeskär's status as the tallest waterfall in Sweden was questioned by author and photographer Claes Grundsten in 2014. In an article in the journal Turist published by Svenska Turistföreningen (Swedish Tourist Association), he noted that there are waterfalls far north in Sweden, little known to the general public, whose total drop far exceeds the drop of Njupeskär. Specifically, the twin falls Greven and Grevinnan in Stora Sjöfallet National Park are described. Both have drops of more than 250 m.

References and notes 

Waterfalls of Sweden
Landforms of Dalarna County